CESR may refer to:

 Center for Economic and Social Rights, an international human rights organization
 Centre d'Etude Spatiale des Rayonnements, now the Institut de Recherche en Astrophysique et Planétologie (IRAP), in France
 Committee of European Securities Regulators, replaced since 2011 by the European Securities and Markets Authority (ESMA)
 Cornell Electron Storage Ring, a particle accelerator operated by Cornell University, in Ithaca (state of New York)
 Carrier Ethernet Switches and Routers, a marketing term